Last Stand at Khe Sanh: The U.S. Marines' Finest Hour in Vietnam is a book written by American journalist Gregg Jones and published by Da Capo Press in April 2014. It is Jones' third book.

Content

Last Stand at Khe Sanh: The U.S. Marines' Finest Hour in Vietnam illustrates, using extensive archival research, in-depth interviews, and oral histories, the 77-day siege of a Marine combat base at Khe Sanh, South Vietnam in 1968 as experienced by the men who fought it. This battle marked the first time the U.S. military abandoned an operating base under enemy pressure in Vietnam, and is considered a critical moment in America's failed war.

Recognition
Marine Corps Heritage Foundation 2015 General Wallace M. Greene, Jr. Award for distinguished nonfiction.

References

2014 non-fiction books
Military books
Non-fiction books about war
Vietnam War books
Da Capo Press books